The canton of Loudun is an administrative division of the Vienne department, western France. Its borders were modified at the French canton reorganisation which came into effect in March 2015. Its seat is in Loudun.

It consists of the following communes:
 
Angliers
Arçay
Aulnay
Basses
Berrie
Berthegon
Beuxes
Bournand
Ceaux-en-Loudun
Cernay
Chalais
La Chaussée
Chouppes
Coussay
Craon
Curçay-sur-Dive
Dercé
Doussay
Glénouze
La Grimaudière
Guesnes
Loudun
Martaizé
Maulay
Mazeuil
Messemé
Moncontour
Monts-sur-Guesnes
Morton
Mouterre-Silly
Nueil-sous-Faye
Pouançay
Pouant
Prinçay
Ranton
Raslay
La Roche-Rigault
Roiffé
Saint-Clair
Saint-Jean-de-Sauves
Saint-Laon
Saint-Léger-de-Montbrillais
Saires
Saix
Sammarçolles
Ternay
Les Trois-Moutiers
Verrue
Vézières

References

Cantons of Vienne